Charles Robinson (8 June 1907–1990) was an English footballer who played in the Football League for Accrington Stanley, Ashington, Blackpool, Exeter City, Gillingham and Rochdale.

References

1907 births
1990 deaths
English footballers
Association football forwards
English Football League players
Ashington A.F.C. players
Bedlington United A.F.C. players
Blackpool F.C. players
Exeter City F.C. players
Gillingham F.C. players
Accrington Stanley F.C. (1891) players
Rochdale A.F.C. players
Blyth Spartans A.F.C. players